Ibn Ashir (1582 – 1631 CE) (AH 990 – 1042 AH ) known as Imam Ibn Ashir or simply Ibn Ashir was a prominent Moroccan jurist in the Maliki school from Fez, Morocco. His Murshid al-Mu'een is arguably the best known of the Maliki texts in the Islamic world. It is still widely sung and memorised in madrasas and Quranic schools throughout North Africa to this day.

See also
 List of Islamic scholars
 List of Ash'aris and Maturidis

References

1582 births
1631 deaths
Asharis
Moroccan scholars
Moroccan Maliki scholars
People from Fez, Morocco